Benzedrone (4-MBC) is a designer drug which has been found since 2010 as an ingredient in a number of "bath salt" mixes sold as recreational drugs.

See also
 Substituted cathinone
 Benzphetamine
 Benzylone
 Cyputylone
 4-MEC
 Mephedrone

References 

Cathinones
Designer drugs